My Sister and I is a 1954 West German musical film directed by Paul Martin and starring Sonja Ziemann, Adrian Hoven and Herta Staal. It is based on the 1930 stage work of the same name.

It was filmed at the Spandau Studios in Berlin and on location in Bavaria and at Weikersheim Castle. The film's sets were designed by Gabriel Pellon.

Cast
 Sonja Ziemann as Christine
 Adrian Hoven as Rudi Becker
 Herta Staal as Irma
 Paul Hörbiger as Christines Vater
 Werner Fuetterer as Graf Kollinoff
 Licci Bala as Baronin
 Rudolf Platte as Herr Huber
 Hans Stiebner as Finanzminister
 Franz-Otto Krüger as Justizminister
 Stanislav Ledinek as Kriegsminister
 William Trenk as König
 Walter Werner as Gustav
 Ruth Piepho

References

Bibliography 
 Bock, Hans-Michael & Bergfelder, Tim. The Concise Cinegraph: Encyclopaedia of German Cinema. Berghahn Books, 2009.

External links 
 

1954 films
1954 musical films
German musical films
West German films
1950s German-language films
Films directed by Paul Martin
Films based on works by Louis Verneuil
German films based on plays
Films based on adaptations
Films based on operettas
Operetta films
Remakes of German films
Gloria Film films
Films scored by Ralph Benatzky
Films shot at Spandau Studios
1950s German films